Theodore Glenn Scalissi (October 26, 1921 – January 6, 1987) was a professional American football and basketball player. He was born in Madison, Wisconsin.

Professional sports career
Scalissi played with the Chicago Rockets of the All-America Football Conference (AAFC) in 1947. He had also been drafted by the Green Bay Packers in the 17th round of the 1947 NFL Draft. Collegiately, he played at Ripon College.

Scalissi also played for the Oshkosh All-Stars in the National Basketball League during the 1947–48 season. The National Basketball League was a forerunner to the modern National Basketball Association (NBA).

Head coaching record

College football

References

External links
 Ripon Hall of Fame profile
 

1921 births
1987 deaths
American men's basketball players
American football halfbacks
Guards (basketball)
Chicago Rockets players
Ripon Red Hawks men's basketball players
Ripon Red Hawks football players
Milton Wildcats football coaches
Oshkosh All-Stars players
College men's track and field athletes in the United States
High school basketball coaches in Wisconsin
High school football coaches in Wisconsin
Sportspeople from Madison, Wisconsin
Coaches of American football from Wisconsin
Players of American football from Wisconsin
Basketball coaches from Wisconsin
Basketball players from Wisconsin